Pristimantis pastazensis is a species of frog in the family Strabomantidae.
It is endemic to Ecuador.
Its natural habitats are tropical moist montane forests and heavily degraded former forest.
It is threatened by habitat loss.

References

pastazensis
Amphibians of Ecuador
Endemic fauna of Ecuador
Amphibians described in 1945
Taxonomy articles created by Polbot